Abu Qilqil (also transliterated Abu Qalqal or Qibab Abu Qalqal) is a town in the northeastern Aleppo Governorate, northwestern Syria. Nearby localities include district center Manbij  to the northwest. In the 2004 census, it had a population of 2,742.

References

Populated places in Manbij District